Nils Schomber (born 15 March 1994) is a German cyclist, who most recently rode for UCI Continental team . He rode in the individual pursuit and team pursuit at the 2014 UCI Track Cycling World Championships.

Major results

2011
 National Junior Track Championships
1st  Individual pursuit
1st  Team pursuit (with Ruben Zepuntke, Stefan Schneider and Nils Politt)
2012
 National Junior Track Championships
1st  Individual pursuit
1st  Madison (with Nils Politt)
 1st  Time trial, National Junior Road Championships
 UEC European Junior Track Championships
2nd Individual pursuit
3rd Team pursuit
2013
 National Track Championships
2nd Omnium
3rd Scratch
3rd Team pursuit
2014
 1st  Team pursuit, National Track Championships (with Kersten Thiele, Henning Bommel and Theo Reinhardt)
 2nd Team pursuit, UEC European Track Championships (with Henning Bommel, Theo Reinhardt, Leon Rohde and Kersten Thiele)
2015
 1st  Team pursuit, National Track Championships (with Henning Bommel, Theo Reinhardt and Domenic Weinstein)
 National Road Championships
1st  Team time trial
3rd Under-23 time trial
 1st Stage 4 Dookoła Mazowsza
 6th Overall Tour de Berlin
2017
 2nd Team pursuit, National Track Championships
2018
 National Track Championships
3rd Individual pursuit
3rd Team pursuit
2019
 1st  Team pursuit, National Track Championships (with Felix Groß, Theo Reinhardt and Leon Rohde)

References

External links
 

1994 births
Living people
German track cyclists
German male cyclists
Place of birth missing (living people)
Olympic cyclists of Germany
Cyclists at the 2016 Summer Olympics
Sportspeople from Neuss
Cyclists from North Rhine-Westphalia
21st-century German people